General elections were held in San Marino on 14 November 1920 to elect the sixth term of the Grand and General Council. It was the country's first snap election, and the first election to use a form of proportional representation. The result was a victory for the Sammarinese People's Party, which won 29 of the 60 seats.

Electoral system
Following Italy, San Marino adopted a party-list proportional representation electoral system on 15 October 1920. The three-class division was eliminated, and councillors' terms limited to four years.

Voters had to be citizens of San Marino, male, the head of the family and 24 years old.

Campaign
The Sammarinese People's Party made its debut, after Pope Benedict's abolition of the non expedit had allowed the foundation of its twin, the Italian People's Party. By their part, landowners created a conservative party, the Sammarinese Democratic Union, campaigning for the return to pre-1906 institutions to restore order against strikes and political violence.

Results

Aftermath
The Socialists refused to join the newly elected council, following a revolutionary political strategy. On 11 January 1921, all Socialist seats were declared vacant due to absence and a by-election was held on 10 April, in which ten Christian democrats and eight conservatives were elected.

References

San Marino
General elections in San Marino
General
San Marino